Painting and Travel is an educational television show produced by Roger and Sarah Bansemer. It is broadcast primarily on PBS channels and has found a place in the ranks of PBS educational painting series Bob Ross and The Joy of Painting and Paint This with Jerry Yarnell. The show has aired on 176 television stations.

A typical episode begins with Sarah narrating a video tour of the filming location, which is chosen for its scenic or historic interest. The video tour ends with an introduction to Roger's painting project for the episode. Roger then demonstrates the painting process and teaches painting principles as he does so. His painting demonstration is usually interrupted by Sarah interviewing someone in the area.
Most of the paintings are seascapes and rural scenes.
Roger paints in acrylics and oils, in the impressionist style. All episodes are 30 minutes in length.

Series overview

Season 1 (2011)

Season 2 (2011)

Season 3 (2012)

Season 4 (2012-2013)

Season 5 (2013)

Season 6 (2014)

Season 7 (2015)

Season 8 (2016)

Season 9 (2017)

Season 10 (2018)

References

External links
Roger and Sarah Bansemer's website

2011 American television series debuts
English-language television shows
American non-fiction television series
Works about painting
PBS original programming
Television series about art